Skogseidvatnet is a lake in Bjørnafjorden Municipality in Vestland county, Norway. Water from the river Orraelva and the lake Gjønavatnet flow into the lake, and then it flows out into the lake Henangervatnet before flowing out into the fjord.

See also
List of lakes in Norway

References

Lakes of Vestland
Bjørnafjorden